Portishead South railway station served the town of Portishead, Somerset, England from 1907 to 1940 on the Weston, Clevedon and Portishead Railway.

History 
The station opened on 7 August 1907 by the Weston, Clevedon and Portishead Railway. It had no platform, just a shelter and a siding that was used by a coal merchant. It closed on 20 May 1940.

References

External links 

Disused railway stations in Somerset
Railway stations in Great Britain opened in 1907
Railway stations in Great Britain closed in 1940
1907 establishments in England
1940 disestablishments in England